The Tasmanian Heritage Register is the statutory heritage register of the Australian state of Tasmania. It is defined as a list of areas currently identified as having historic cultural heritage importance to Tasmania as a whole. The Register is kept by the Tasmanian Heritage Council within the meaning of the Tasmanian Historic Cultural Heritage Act 1995. It encompasses in addition the Heritage Register of the Tasmanian branch of the National Trust of Australia, which was merged into the Tasmanian Heritage Register. The enforcement of the heritage's requirements is managed by Heritage Tasmania.

2015-2017 removals and additions 
The register integrity has been complicated by changes of the list from 2015-2017. A state government push to eliminate 1650 properties from the register has led to several criticisms and the resignation of a senior staff member of Heritage Tasmania.

Heritage listings
An incomplete list of Tasmanian heritage listings  follows.

 Albert Hall, Launceston
 Avalon Theatre, Hobart
 Boag's Brewery, Launceston
 Brickendon Estate, Longford
 Bridgewater Bridge
 Callington Mill, Oatlands
 Cadbury's Estate, Claremont
 Cape Bruny Lighthouse
 Cape Sorell Lighthouse
 Cape Wickham Lighthouse
 Cascade Brewery, South Hobart
 Cascades Female Factory, South Hobart
 Cataract Gorge
 Cheshunt House, Meander
 Church of the Apostles, Launceston
 City Park, Launceston
 Coal Mines Historic Site, Saltwater Rover
 Constitution Dock, Hobart
 Currie Lighthouse
 Deal Island Lighthouse
 Elwick Racecourse, Glenorchy
 Empire Hotel, Queenstown
 Entally House, Hadspen
 Franklin Square, Hobart
 Gaiety Theatre, Zeehan
 General Post Office, Hobart
 St David's Cathedral, Hobart
 Hobart Cenotaph
 Hobart City Hall
 Hobart Real Tennis Club
 Hobart Synagogue
 Hobart Town Hall
 Holyman House, Launceston
 Hope and Anchor Tavern, Hobart
 Ingle Hall, Hobart
 Iron Pot Lighthouse
 Kelly's Steps, Hobart
 Lady Franklin Gallery, Lenah Valley
 Launceston College, Tasmania
 Longford Railway Bridge
 Low Head Lighthouse
 Maatsuyker Island Lighthouse
 Majestic Theatre, Launceston
 Maria Island
 Mona Vale, Ross
 Montrose House, Glenorchy
 National Theatre, Launceston
 North Hobart Post Office
 Old Woolstore Apartment Hotel, Hobart
 Parliament House, Hobart
 Port Arthur, Tasmania
 Prince's Square, Launceston
 Princess Theatre, Launceston
 Queen Victoria Museum and Art Gallery
 Queenstown Oval, Launceston
 Red Bridge, Campbell Town
 Richmond Bridge
 Richmond Gaol
 Ross Bridge
 Ross Female Factory
 Royal Hobart Hospital
 Royal Tasmanian Botanical Gardens, Hobart
 St Andrew's Kirk, Launceston
 St. George's Anglican Church, Battery Point
 Saltwater River, Tasmania
 Shot Tower, Taroona
 St John's Anglican Church, New Town
 St John's Church, Launceston
 St Mary's Cathedral, Hobart
 Star Theatre, Invermay
 State Library of Tasmania, Hobart
 Symmons Plains Estate, Perth
 Table Cape, Wynyard
 Tasman Island Lighthouse
 Tasmanian Museum and Art Gallery, Hobart
 Theatre Royal, Hobart
 Victoria Dock, Hobart
 Woolmers Estate, Longford
 Wrest Point Hotel Casino, Sandy Bay
 York Park, Launceston

References

External links
 

 
Heritage registers in Australia